George Peter Svendsen (March 22, 1913 – August 6, 1995) was an American football player.  After his college career at Oregon State and the University of Minnesota, he starred for the Green Bay Packers. He also played one season for the Oshkosh All-Stars of the National Basketball League.

Svendsen played in 52 NFL games, starting in 31 of them. He played in both playoff games for the Packers in 1936 and 1941. He had one career reception, for 11 yards in 1937. He was named to the 2nd Team All-Pro by Collyers Eye Magazine, the NFL, and UPI. Svendsen is one of ten players that were named to the National Football League 1930s All-Decade Team that have not been inducted into the Pro Football Hall of Fame.

References

External links
 
 

1913 births
1995 deaths
American football centers
American men's basketball players
American military personnel of World War II
Basketball players from Minneapolis
Centers (basketball)
Forwards (basketball)
Green Bay Packers players
Iowa Pre-Flight Seahawks football players
High school basketball coaches in Wisconsin
High school football coaches in Wisconsin
Minnesota Golden Gophers football coaches
Minnesota Golden Gophers football players
Minnesota Golden Gophers men's basketball players
Oshkosh All-Stars players
Players of American football from Minneapolis
Saint Mary's Pre-Flight Air Devils football coaches
Sports coaches from Minneapolis